Peter Müller (born 15 December 1969) is a German former professional footballer who played as a forward.

References

1969 births
Living people
German footballers
Association football forwards
Bundesliga players
2. Bundesliga players
K.R.C. Mechelen players
1. FC Köln players
FC 08 Homburg players
German expatriate footballers
German expatriate sportspeople in Belgium
Expatriate footballers in Belgium